Daddy Knows Best is an American comedy web series created, written and produced by Jeff Danis, Ryan O'Neill and starring Stephen Rannazzisi from The League, an American sitcom about a fantasy football league. The series is broadcast on the internet and premiered in 2012, distributed across the web including on My Damn Channel and Blip.  Daddy Knows best is a comedy web series about a Dad who gets himself into terrible situation and is really bad at being a father. Daddy Knows Best has received over 72,528,411 views combined since April 2012.

A second season was announced in 2013.

Season 1 

Episode 1: The Babysitter - Steve has a traumatizing experience with a babysitter 
Episode 2: Special Brownies - Steve bakes some pot brownies that fall into the wrong hands. 
Episode 3: Taser - Steve forgets his child and gets into a fight. 
Episode 4: A Trip To Swim - Steve takes his kid to a strip club. His wife is not happy 
Episode 5: Sh** - Steve has an accident which involves excrement. 
Episode 6: A YouTube Sensation - Steve exploits his kid for internet fame. 
Episode 7: Game Night - Steve gets too sexual at porno pictionary game night.

References

External links 
 

American comedy web series
2012 web series debuts
Sitcom web series